Salem County was a former county in east central of South Carolina.  It was created in 1791 from Claremont and Clarendon counties and lasted until it was absorbed into the newly created Sumter District in 1800.

References

Former counties, districts, and parishes of South Carolina
States and territories established in 1791
1800 disestablishments in South Carolina
1791 establishments in South Carolina